Adhemarius is a genus of moths in the family Sphingidae first described by Oitiaca in 1939. They are found in the Americas.

Species
Adhemarius blanchardorum Hodges, 1985 – Blanchard's sphinx moth
Adhemarius daphne (Boisduval, 1870)
Adhemarius dariensis (Rothschild & Jordan, 1903)
Adhemarius dentoni (Clark, 1916)
Adhemarius donysa (Druce, 1889)
Adhemarius eurysthenes (R. Felder, 1874)
Adhemarius fulvescens (Closs, 1915)
Adhemarius gagarini (Zikan, 1935)
Adhemarius gannascus (Stoll, 1790)
Adhemarius globifer (Dyar, 1912)
Adhemarius jamaicensis (Rothschild & Jordan, 1915)
Adhemarius mexicanus Balcázar-Lara & Beutelspacher, 2001
Adhemarius palmeri (Boisduval, 1875)
Adhemarius roessleri Eitschberger, 2002
Adhemarius sexoculata (Grote, 1865)
Adhemarius tigrina (Felder, 1874)
Adhemarius ypsilon (Rothschild & Jordan, 1903)

Gallery

References

 
Ambulycini
Moth genera